The 2000 Shell Velocity Turbo Chargers season was the 16th season of the franchise in the Philippine Basketball Association (PBA).

Draft pick

Transactions

Roster

Elimination round

Games won

References

Shell
Shell Turbo Chargers seasons